Tabounte is a town in Ouarzazate Province, Drâa-Tafilalet, Morocco. According to the 2004 census it has a population of 21,198.

References

Populated places in Ouarzazate Province